"That's What You Get" is a song by American rock band Paramore from their second studio album, Riot! (2007). It is the second Australian single, third American single and the fourth UK single. The song was released to modern rock radio on March 25 and to contemporary hit radio on April 22 in the US. "That's What You Get" was released digitally as an extended play in April 2008 and physically as a CD single in May 2008. The song is featured as a playable track in the video game Rock Band 2.

The song was certified Platinum in the United States on March 24, 2016, selling over 1,000,000 copies. "That's What You Get" enjoyed crossover success on the radio, peaking higher on the pop-based Mainstream Top 40 chart than Alternative Songs.

Composition
Stylistically, "That's What You Get" has been labeled as pop rock, pop punk, power pop, and emo as well as having influences from funk and disco music. Jonathan Bradley from Stylus Magazine described the song as containing a "relentless assault of sugar-sweet riffs and soaring choruses".

Critical reception
Fraser McAlpine at BBC Online gave the song a rating of 4 out of 5 stars, and stated "Paramore's sense of dynamics has always been strong, and the introduction to this song is a great example of that." McAlpine also praises the funk and disco influences during the verses, as well as the drumming style of the song.

Music video
The music video, directed by Marcos Siega, was shot in Nashville, Tennessee, on March 2 and March 3, 2008. MTV2 released the official music video on March 24, 2008. The music video shows the band playing in a living room with clips of a relationship of two lovers (Aaron Holmes [of Death in the Park] and Jenna Galing, both from Gloucester, Virginia*) and a small gathering of the band's family and friends. The couple's relationship is shown to be on the rocks as the girl calls the boy to meet up but then pushes him away. They go throughout their day before the party spending time with the band members and trying to be together. Cut scenes of Hayley Williams singing the song outside in front of the camera with her back to the friends and family are shown. At the party, the boyfriend is approached by another girl who flirts with him and holds his hand. The girlfriend becomes distraught but reunites in an embrace with her boyfriend as the party-goers all sit around a fire pit. The video ends in a fast-motion sequence with the lovers kissing and taking a picture of themselves on a cellphone, and all the people at the party are rushing out the living room, knocking over a couch, and leaving a record spinning.

As of February 2023, the music video for "That's What You Get" has over 200 million views on YouTube.

Background
The music video was shot just over a week after Paramore cancelled their European tour to work on "personal issues", amidst media speculation of the band breaking up. Hayley Williams explained that, given the fragile state of the band, they all thought it best if they kept the shoot low-key, surrounding themselves with their friends and family, keeping it simple.

Williams added "We had tons of friends there, and it really just felt like a hangout session. And Marcos was so cool about it. He said, 'Bring your friends.' We shot it in some of our friends' houses, and it just felt so real ... and I think it's the first time in a video you're gonna get to see who we really are."

Track listing
Digital EP
 "That's What You Get" – 3:40
 "Misery Business"  – 3:46
 "For a Pessimist, I'm Pretty Optimistic" – 3:59

Charts

Certifications

Release history

Notes

References

2007 songs
2008 singles
Paramore songs
Fueled by Ramen singles
Songs written by Hayley Williams
Songs written by Josh Farro
Songs written by Taylor York
Music videos directed by Marcos Siega